The 2013 Subway Firecracker 250 was the 16th stock car race of the 2013 NASCAR Nationwide Series and the 12th iteration of the event. The race was held on Friday, July 5, 2013, in Daytona Beach, Florida at Daytona International Speedway, a 2.5 miles (4.0 km) permanent triangular-shaped superspeedway. The race was extended from its scheduled 100 laps to 101 due to a green–white–checker finish. At race's end, Matt Kenseth, driving for Joe Gibbs Racing, would pull away on the final restart to win his 27th career NASCAR Nationwide Series win and his first of the season. To fill out the podium, James Buescher of Turner Scott Motorsports and Elliott Sadler of Joe Gibbs Racing would finish second and third, respectively.

Background 

Daytona International Speedway is one of three superspeedways to hold NASCAR races, the other two being Indianapolis Motor Speedway and Talladega Superspeedway. The standard track at Daytona International Speedway is a four-turn superspeedway that is 2.5 miles (4.0 km) long. The track's turns are banked at 31 degrees, while the front stretch, the location of the finish line, is banked at 18 degrees.

Entry list 

 (R) denotes rookie driver.
 (i) denotes driver who is ineligible for series driver points.

Practice

First practice 
The first practice session was held on Thursday, July 4, at 2:30 PM EST, and would last for one hour and 20 minutes.

Second and final practice 
The second and final practice session, sometimes referred to as Happy Hour, was held on Thursday, July 4, at 5:30 PM EST, and would last for 55 minutes.

Qualifying 
Qualifying was held on Friday, July 5, at 2:05 PM EST. Each driver would have two laps to set a fastest time; the fastest of the two would count as their official qualifying lap.

Blake Koch was the only driver to fail to qualify.

Full qualifying results

Race results

References 

2013 NASCAR Nationwide Series
NASCAR races at Daytona International Speedway
July 2013 sports events in the United States
2013 in sports in Florida